Thomas Ballard was the member of Parliament for Coventry in 1301. He was a citizen of Coventry.

References 

Members of the Parliament of England for Coventry
14th-century English politicians
English MPs 1301
Year of birth unknown
Year of death unknown